|}

The Prix de Condé is a Group 3 flat horse race in France open to two-year-old thoroughbreds. It is run at Longchamp over a distance of 1,800 metres (about 1⅛ miles), and it is scheduled to take place each year in October.

History 
The event was established in 1867, and it was initially held at Chantilly. It was named after the Princes of Condé, the former owners of the Château de Chantilly. It was originally contested over 2,000 metres.

The race was transferred to Longchamp in 1907. It was abandoned throughout World War I, but there was a substitute version at Chantilly in 1917.

The Prix de Condé was cancelled once during World War II, in 1939. It was run at Auteuil in 1940 and Maisons-Laffitte in 1943, both with a distance of 1,800 metres. It was staged at Le Tremblay in 1944.

The present system of race grading was introduced in 1971, and the Prix de Condé was classed at Group 3 level. It was cut to 1,800 metres in 1985.

Records 
Leading jockey (6 wins):
 Roger Poincelet – Telegram (1949), Simplon (1952), Altipan (1956), Gelsemium (1958), Tchita (1960), Le Mesnil (1962)

Leading trainer (7 wins):
 André Fabre – Dancehall (1988), Cristofori (1991), New Frontier (1996), Thief of Hearts (1997), Graikos (2002), Linda's Lad (2005), Elliptique (2013)

Leading owner (4 wins):
 Édouard de Rothschild – Saint Just (1909), Chateau Lafite (1917), Bubbles (1927), Amalia (1935)

Winners since 1980

Earlier winners 

 1867: Lady Henriette
 1868: Massinissa
 1869: Bachelette
 1870: no race
 1871: Revigny
 1872:
 1873: Saltarelle
 1874: Almanza
 1875: Basquine
 1876: Jongleur
 1877: Solliciteuse
 1878: Sheridan
 1879: La Flandrie
 1880: La Bultee
 1881: Seigneur
 1882: Farfadet
 1883: Escogriffe
 1884: Valentin
 1885: Utrecht
 1886: Oviedo
 1887: Saint Gall
 1888: Prophete
 1889: Bougie
 1890: Primerose
 1891: Fair Head
 1892: Argenteuil
 1893: Le Pompon
 1894: Le Justicier
 1895:
 1896: Ortie Blanche
 1897: Volnay
 1898: Sospiro
 1899: Codoman
 1900: Jacobite
 1901: Kruger
 1902: Etang d'Or
 1903: Feuille de Chou
 1904: Genial
 1905: Monsieur Perichon
 1906: Claudia
 1907: Talo Biribil
 1908: Aveu
 1909: Saint Just
 1910: Made in England
 1911: Mongolie
 1912: Pirpiriol
 1913: Oreste
 1914–16: no race
 1917: Chateau Lafite
 1918: no race
 1919: Campa
 1920: Harpocrate
 1921: Ramus
 1922: Massine
 1923: Roquentin
 1924: Sherry
 1925: Becassine
 1926: Accalmie
 1927: Bubbles
 1928: Dictateur X
 1929: Beldurhissa
 1930: Barneveldt
 1931: Gris Perle
 1932: Minestrone
 1933: Denver
 1934: Finlandaise
 1935: Amalia
 1936: Galloway
 1937: Castel Fusano
 1938: Galerien
 1939: no race
 1940: Le Marmot
 1941: Massinor
 1942: Verso II
 1943: Laborde
 1944: Basileus
 1945: Prince Chevalier
 1946: Rose O'Lynn
 1947:
 1948: Tagala
 1949: Telegram
 1950: Le Tyrol
 1951: Le Bourgeois
 1952: Simplon
 1953: Friendship
 1954: Walhalla
 1955: Lagides
 1956: Altipan
 1957: Apple Pippin
 1958: Gelsemium
 1959: Wordpam
 1960: Tchita
 1961: Montfleur
 1962: Le Mesnil
 1963: Le Fabuleux
 1964: Jacambre
 1965: A Tempo
 1966: Phaeton
 1967: La Lagune
 1968: Longpont
 1969: Faldor
 1970: Skelda
 1971: Relpin
 1972: Margouillat
 1973: Riverton
 1974: Blocus
 1975: French Friend
 1976: El Criollo
 1977: Pevero
 1978: Top Ville
 1979: Corvaro

See also 
 List of French flat horse races

References 

 France Galop / Racing Post:

 france-galop.com – A Brief History: Prix de Condé.
 galopp-sieger.de – Prix de Condé.
 horseracingintfed.com – International Federation of Horseracing Authorities – Prix de Condé (2018).
 pedigreequery.com – Prix de Condé – Longchamp.

Flat horse races for two-year-olds
Longchamp Racecourse
Horse races in France
Recurring sporting events established in 1867
1867 establishments in France